NZSki Ltd, or nzski.com manages three major New Zealand commercial ski fields; two in Queenstown, The Remarkables and Coronet Peak, and Mt. Hutt nearer to Christchurch. The company is based in Queenstown. It was formerly part of the Mount Cook Group, which was bought by Air New Zealand in 1984 and split up in 1989.

In 2002, Air New Zealand sold NZSki for NZD 27 million to joint venture Southern Alpine Resort Recreation Limited, comprising NZSki management, Millbrook Resort developer Graham Smolenski, Tourism Milford Ltd and Trojan Holdings Ltd.

See also
The Remarkables
Coronet Peak
Mount Hutt

External links
 Official NZSKI.com website
 The Remarkables official website
 Coronet Peak official website
 Mt. Hutt official website
 Ski Queenstown official website

References

Entertainment companies of New Zealand
Companies based in Queenstown, New Zealand